Giulia Viola (born 24 April 1991) is an Italian middle-distance runner.

Biography
Viola was the Italian national champion in the 5000 metres. Viola was a finalist at the 2013 European Athletics Indoor Championships in the 1500 metres finishing 7th. At the 2014 European Athletics Championships Viola finished 8th in the 5000 metres with a personal best time.

References

External links
 

1991 births
Italian female middle-distance runners
Living people
Athletics competitors of Fiamme Gialle